Sid Rainey (born in 1968 in Sligo, Ireland) is an Irish musician and television producer known for Underground Ernie and his work as a musician and comedy writer.

Compulsion
Rainey first came to prominence as the bass player for Irish punk band Compulsion in 1990.

Television production
Sid Rainey has been involved in film and television in the U.K. for almost fifteen years creating animated children's television, comedy panel quiz shows, sit-coms, talk-based music interview shows, feature films and short films. He co-created and executive produced the hit cartoon series Underground Ernie which was broadcast on the BBC and in various territories around the world.

He also has done stand-up comedy and was the bassist for the world-famous post punk band Compulsion and was signed to One Little Indian UK/Interscope Records US.

In August 2015, Sid directed a W.B. Yeats play The Resurrection. He is currently finishing a series of film and television projects, a stage play and a new animated TV series.

Sid recently wrote and directed a music video for recording artist Dean Gurrie for his single Give Me A Chance in  2016 and Dean's second music video New Beginnings, to be released later this year.

Professional Experience and Significant Achievements

Creating Television and Film projects (present) - Creating comedy panel quiz shows, sit coms, feature films and talk-based music interview shows.

Co-creator of BBC2/CBeebies Underground Ernie - (2006-2007)

Created the concept, story, characters, and character designs for this British computer-animated children's television hit series, which ran 2006-2007 twice a day for five days a week. Oversaw script development and story outlines with renowned children's writer Jan Page. Secured Gary Lineker, Tim Whitnall, Janet Brown, Chris Jarvis, Howard Ward and Emma Weaver for voice-overs.  Created and set up Joella Productions which financed and produced the 26 episodes,

Achievements - Underground Ernie was officially declared the most watched children's series on BBC during the 2006-2007 period.

Freelance writer for Ealing Studios, Tiger Aspect, Channel 4  - (2001-2006)

The company created and produced a popular animated series, Underground Ernie, about a group of talking trains and their human colleagues, Ernie, Millie and Mr Rails. Underground Ernie was first shown on CBeebies and BBC2 in 2006 and has quickly become a popular hit.

References
Sligoman behind hit BBC cartoon series, The Sligo Champion, 13 September 2006.
Underground Ernie is tops with kids, The Irish Post, 27 September 2006.

External links

Joella Productions website

1968 births
Living people
Irish bass guitarists
Irish television producers